Afghan Post is the national mail and courier organization of Afghanistan with its headquarters in Kabul. It has offices in all 34 provinces and 420 or so districts of Afghanistan.

Most homes in Afghanistan, particularly in older neighborhoods and in the rural areas, do not have street addresses. Names and other descriptions may be used in place of street addresses.

History
The first postal arrangements in Afghanistan are credited to Sher Ali Khan, who established a postal service in the 1860s as part of a program to modernize the country. In the late 1970s, it had grown into one of the stronger regional postal services, able to send and receive letters from anywhere in the world.

Timeline

1870: Establishment of Balahisar Post office in Kabul and a post office in the center of each province of the country serving Primary Postal Services Affairs and Postal Stamps.
1892: A Post Office near Arg was established.
1908: Postal network developed more.
1918: General Directorship of Post and Telegraph & Telephone was included in the Organization of the Interior Ministry.
1918: A Post office was established in each of the big cities.
1925: International post services began between Afghanistan and British India via Torkham.
1928: General Directorship of Post and Telegraph & Telephone becomes and Independent Administration.
1928: Afghanistan became of a member of the Universal Postal Union.
1928: After having joined the Universal Postal Union and some other individual company agreement were signed.
1929: Post is conveyed towards Torkham and Kandahar by vehicles.
1929: Various type of deliveries such as letters, postcards, newspapers, magazine and other printed materials as well as parcels are made inside and outside of the country.
1934: Title of the post administration from General Directorship of Telephone and Telegraph was changed into the Department of Telephone and Telegraph, and later on it was elevated to the Ministry of Communication.
1973: Law of postal services was amended.

During the 1990s, the Afghan postal service was suspended due to a civil war in the country. Sending a letter usually meant having to find someone traveling in the direction of the recipient willing to carry a note and hoping for the best. It gradually began to develop in the mid 2000s during the presidency of Hamid Karzai.

See also
Postage stamps and postal history of Afghanistan
Communications in Afghanistan
Transport in Afghanistan

Reference

External links

Official website

Communications in Afghanistan
Philately of Afghanistan
Postal organizations
Postal systems by country